Monsters Inside Me is an American television documentary series about infectious diseases. It includes first-person interviews with people and medical professionals telling their personal stories about contracting various parasitic, viral, bacterial, and fungal diseases. Interviews with contributors are shot on location across North America. Recreations are mostly filmed in hospitals and homes in New York City.

The series aired on Animal Planet in the US, and Discovery Science in Canada.

Season 1 (2009)

Season 2 (2010)

Season 3 (2012)

Season 4 (2013)

Season 5 (2014)

Season 6 (2015)

Season 7 (2016)

Season 8 (2017)

Notes

Monsters Inside Me